Canungrantmictis is a genus of Australian true bugs containing a single species, C. morindana. It was described in 2002 by Harry Brailovsky.

References

Mictini
Coreidae genera
Insects of Australia
Insects described in 2002